Wynnehaven Beach is an unincorporated community in Okaloosa County in the state of Florida in the United States.  Wynnehaven Beach has a population of 2,789, as of the 2015 American Community Survey. Wynnehaven Beach is a bedroom community for Hurlburt Field and Eglin Air Force Base. Wynnehaven Beach is oftentimes considered to be part of the larger neighboring community of Navarre.

References 

Navarre, Florida

Populated places on the Intracoastal Waterway in Florida